Soccer AM's All Sports Show is a television programme that is a spin-off of Sky Sports' popular Saturday-morning show Soccer AM, launched in 2002 and originally hosted by Tim Lovejoy and Helen Chamberlain until 2004 when Andy Goldstein replaced Lovejoy.

It was shown on every Friday during the football season from 6-7:00 p.m. on Sky Sports 1, with repeats shown regularly throughout the night on Sky3 and Sky Sports 2.

When Lovejoy left Soccer AM in the summer of 2007, Goldstein was again called to replace him leaving the future of the All-Sports show in doubt. At the end of the 10th and final All Sports Show podcast it was confirmed that the show would not be returning for the 2007–08 season. The show's web site  was also taken down. The majority of the production team's transfer to the main Soccer AM show is a contributory factor in the show ending.

Format

Unlike its sister programme, The All Sports show focuses on a wider range of sports. This means that as well as football, sports like cricket, rugby (both Union and League) and even "American sports" like the NFL and the NBA are covered on the show.

Features 

"Face in the Crowd"- The camera will roll on the crowd during a major sporting event from the past week and will stop (seemingly) at random on one particular person. However, this person is always a famous celebrity or sportsman etc. Helen and Andy then asks the person to ring the show and claim their prize, claiming "it can't be any of your mates, it has to be you."
"Football Elite"- This section focuses on some of the major football headlines and stories from newspapers throughout the world. The link to Football Elite, is given out by Andy Goldstein. This link is usually tedious, and in the past has been delivered in a variety of ways.
"We will always have time for........"- This section happens at the start of the show, when one of the presenters (Usually Helen Chamberlain) tells the viewers how packed the show is, but then says "But we will always have time for......" In original series it was for "Lovely Lucy" but now it is for certain shots etc. from the past week in sport. For example, Chamberlain said "But we will always have time for sixes, sixes, sixes" Then clips of sixes in cricket will be shown, and a cartoon style "KAPOW" will be heard when the ball hits the bat. Following these clips Wicky Wayne performs a rap, about the clips then clicks his fingers and that same "KAPOW" noise is heard.
"Spanish commentary"- Highlights from the matches in the last week involving Barcelona and Real Madrid "as our friends in Spain saw it." The "Spanish" commentator is, in fact, crew member Sheephead, who uses a mixture of very basic Spanish and English. Common quotes from this section include "peep peep! Penalty!","Fruity Guti", "In the mixa!", "Giuly, me julie!", "Beckham, Ping!", "OH JAMMY WOODWORK!!!", "Gooooooooooaaaaaaalllllll!" while Barcelona's home ground, the Nou Camp, is often referred to as the "Campy Nou Nou". Barcelona's highlights conclude with the commentator saying "I wanna rock with you, Frank 'Right-Guard'!" (a pun on the name of Barcelona coach, Frank Rijkaard), while Real Madrid's matches ended with a "hickory dickory dock, Zidane" until he retired last season. And once the phrase A Beckham PING!! Oh Chesty Chesty Morgan jammy goal were used. ((See video in external links entitled Spanish Commentary Video)).
"Football Expert's Predictions"- Four popular pundits from Sky Sports' Soccer Saturday programme; "Lettuce" Matt Le Tissier, Phil Thompson, Peter Reid and "Champagne" Charlie Nicholas, predict what they think the score will be in one of the weekend's Premiership fixtures. The following week the goals from that match are shown alongside a reminder of the guesses from the so-called "experts". If any of the pundits manage to get the score right, a clip from the archives of their playing career would be shown, supposedly celebrating their victory.
"Plays of the week"- The top six or so "plays" from the past week. These plays may be fantastic goals from football, brilliant catches or run outs from the cricket, superb tries from the rugby, holes in one or delightful chip-ins from the golf, or sensational slam dunks from the NBA. This section is usually introduced by "the doosies", as referred to by "the dweeb", an American college student who previously explained rules such as the NFL playoffs in his own enthusiastic way. These "doosies" are usually terrible, often comical, blunders from the sport in the week.
"Australian Goals"- The best goals from the A-League, for the Australians watching the show. These goals are accompanied by a spoof ticker of the latest soap news and the song that is currently number 1 in the download charts (another spoof featuring an Australian song from years gone by). This section is sponsored by "Ute-Lube" engine oil- "I wouldn't buy it if I didn't love it!"
"Sound"- A competition open to the public, i.e. the show's viewers, where the original prize was three All Sports Show golf balls, three All Sports Show dart flights, an All Sports Show posing pouch and, for a limited time only, an exclusive "Olympic Torch" by guessing correctly a short snippet which lasts only for a second or two. Goldstein often says that the viewers' calls "would be answered by their call centre in Mumbai where their calls would be answered in (Chamberlain: "11") minutes." The torch was discontinued after the 2006 Winter Olympics. If no-one guessed the sporting sound correctly, the following week the same sound will be used but it will be a rollover- 6 golf balls, 6 dart flights and two posing pouches. In the most recent season, the current, viewers of the show have the chance to win a pack of All Sports Show Playing Cards, featuring Goldstein as the King and Chambers as the Queen. On the most recent shows a Pádraig Harrington "I'm saving up for a Jet" electric mustard coloured T-shirt has been up for grabs as well after a now infamous quote by the Irish golfer while phoning the show after winning the PGA European Tour's Order of Merit title.
"Trev's Destruction Tapes"- a recent addition for the 2006–07 season, crew member Trev will be asked by a fan of the show to try to destroy some sporting equipment with the aim of finding out which one is stronger. So far, Trev has experimented between a football shin pad and a cricket pad, tennis racquets through the ages, and a rugby ball and an American football amongst others. The tests include dropping them from the top of a tall building, burning them and destroying the kit with a mallet, tank, chainsaw etc. Sometimes, Trev would attempt more dangerous experiments, such as placing the kit in question in liquid nitrogen or in between a Catherine wheel.
"Wicky Wicky Wayne Time"- This is a small section on the show where viewers send in their random sporting clips taken using their mobile phones or camcorders. This part of the show can involve many feats of randomness, like chipping a volleyball into a basketball net from the other end of the court. This is commentated on by Wayne (Adam Smith, "Baby Elvis") who talks over it with his rapping skills.
"Sport Hurts"- This section currently wraps up the show and focuses on the more painful side of sport. It shows sportspeople being hurt by collisions or some other way. Sports regularly in this section include speedway, extreme sports and football. Previously Sport Hurts was presented by the Original Mr Sport Hurts, who had an immense distaste for skiers, snowboarders, Skateboarders or any other tree hugging hippies who needed a job.  He was then replaced by "McSport Hurts Man" who has a Scottish accent and is generally deemed inferior to the original Mr Sport Hurts. He often says things you'd expect to see in a comic, like "WAMMO!", "OUCHY!!" and "BOSH!" before ending with a warning: "Remember kids, sport hurts, so go hard or go home." In the current season, this section is commentated by someone with a male Russian accent accompanied with Hanna-Barbera sound effects.

Previous features 
"60 second darts challenge"- A major sportsperson has a go at trying to score as many points as possible with normal darts and a normal dartboard in a minute. The champion is golfer Ian Poulter who scored 663 points, beating darts pros such as Phil Taylor, Wayne Mardle, Colin Lloyd and Raymond van Barneveld. When England cricketer Matthew Hoggard had his turn, he threw all three of his darts at the same time. This technique, which has become known as "the Hoggard", has since been outlawed by the Professional Darts Corporation.
"The Yellow to Black Challenge"- The aim of this challenge was to pot the coloured snooker balls (i.e. not the reds) from their respective spots on the table in the correct order (yellow, green, brown, blue, pink and black) in as quick a time as possible. It would be attempted every week during the 2004–05 season by snooker stars such as Steve Davis, Ronnie O'Sullivan or Jimmy White, other sports stars or members of the public. It was soon discovered that the public was breaking the official world record for the format, then held by former World Champion Ken Doherty. However these did not count as official new records as, most notably, a Guinness World Records adjudicator was not present to see it. So, to make up for it, the last show of the season featured highlights from the Yellow to Black Challenge World Record Attempt, with all the Guinness World Records requirements met. That day did see the record broken.

Podcast 
During the summer months, whilst the all sports show is not on air, the team have been recording a weekly podcast. This will run over eleven weeks, and is available for downloading off iTunes. The weekly podcast is around 30 minutes long, and is presented by Andy Goldstein. Throughout the weeks, the main all sports team join Goldstein to make the show, but sometimes some team members cannot make it. For example, in week one and three, Helen Chamberlain was not present in the studio, but did appear on the phone. The other team members consist of Tom, Dave, Trev and Adam. Tom, Dave and Adam have all missed shows, but Trev has constantly being present for the shows recording. In episode seven, both Dave and Adam could not make it, so Soccer AM star Chris Nutbean had to stand in to make up the numbers. The show has the same format each week, consisting off:

"Welcome to the show"- Goldstein interviews all team members, and asks them what they have been up to in the week.
"Competition"- The winner of the previous week's competition is read out, and then all of the team (barring Chamberlain and Goldstein, although Chamberlain did participate one week) tell the listeners of their idea for a competition. The best competition is then chosen by Helen Chamberlain or Andy Goldstein, and this becomes the competition. The prize always consists of; All sports darts-flight and golfballs, a Pádraig Harrington T-shirt stating "I'm saving up for a jet," and a pack of all sport's show cards. Then the prize is just what Trev has managed to steal from the office.
 "Celebrity on the phone"- In the next section of the show, a celebrity guest is interviewed on the phone, and is usually asked about sport and what sports they like to perform. Some examples of guests include, Chris Tarrant and Tamzin Outhwaite.
 "Response to emails"- In this section of the podcast, the team answer some of the questions which the listeners have sent in via email. These questions are usually based around sport, but sometimes they are on other subjects.
 "Story of the week"- In the penultimate section of the podcast, each team member (not normally including Chamberlain) have to tell the listeners about a sporting story which they have found interesting from the last week. Most of the stories are unusual and rather humorous. This section of the show, is also famous for Tom's stories, which are always hardly related to sport. For example, he has had stories on a girl walking in a park and finding a diamond, somebody wrestling a leopard in their room, and somebody "swimming" (i.e. taking a dip) in a 17th-century Boroc fountain.
"Goodbye"- In the final part of the podcast, Goldstein re-caps on the competition, and then asks the gang what they will be doing in the week ahead. Goldstein often slates the gang, due to a lack of real exciting thinks which they have planned for the week ahead. Finally, Goldstein and the gang say goodbye, and a small advert for Sky Sports is heard being read out, by Sky Sports news Presenter, Georgie Thompson.

The show also has several comic features, which is always brought up, this include;

"Basically Adam"- In earlier episodes of the podcast, team member Adam, was noted by Goldstein for saying the word "basically" a lot. Hence Adam being renamed to basically Adam. Also, most times that somebody says basically, a big cheer goes up and the word is repeated by Goldstein. Adam tries to avoid using the word, by saying things like "very simply.'
"Jingles"- A small jingle is performed to link up the different sections of the show, and the lyrics to these are thought up, and then sung by Trev. Originally Trev also played the keyboard, but this job was taken over by Adam, and performed once by Helen Chamberlain, when Adam was on holiday. However, in week eight, the keyboard was stolen, so a beat box is now being used. An example of a jingle for story of the week, is as follows;

"If I was you I'd listen up,
impress your mates with stories down the pub,
ever wondered why Abi stewart was always at Yabby Creak,
You might just find out in story of the week, story of the week."

 "Tom's girlfriend"- In an early episode of the show, Tom was asked if he would like children with his girlfriend, and due to the fact he was backed into a corner, he said "not with her maybe." From then on, he is always asked about his girlfriend, with Goldstein trying to get Tom to slip up again."
 "Daves goodbye"- At the end of the podcast, Goldstein runs through all of the team members and they say goodbye, apart from Dave who says "I reet the neet." Nobody understands what he is saying, but Dave insists it will catch on.

External links
 Spanish Commentary Video.

2000s British sports television series
2002 British television series debuts
2007 British television series endings
Sky UK original programming
 
English-language television shows